Gesualdo is an Italian town in the province of Avellino, itself in the region of Campania. It is called "The city of the Prince of Musicians" in honour of Carlo Gesualdo. It has many palaces, fountains, belvederes, and a historical center, which was partially restored after the Irpinia earthquake in 1980.

The town is located in the center of Irpinia, between the valleys of the rivers Fredane and Ufita. Surrounding municipalities are Fontanarosa, Frigento, Grottaminarda, Paternopoli, Villamaina.

Castle

The first records of the Castle of Gesualdo date to Norman rule in the 12th century.

The castle was severely damaged in the 1980 Irpinia earthquake. Restoration work has not been completed yet, but the castle has been partially open to the public since 2015.

Main sights

 Castle of Gesualdo, founded by Lombards in the 7th century, enlarged in the 15th. It was transformed by Carlo Gesualdo in the 16th and by the Cacceses in the 19th.
  Chiesa Madre di San Nicola (Saint Nicholas Mother Church, 12th century) 
 Chiesa del Santissimo Sacramento (Blessed Sacrament Church) (Great Chapel).
 Chiesa del Santissimo Rosario (Most Holy Rosary Church, 17th century) 
 Chiesa di Maria Santissima Addolorata (Our Lady of Sorrows Church, 17th century)  
 Capuchin convent of Santa Maria delle Grazie, founded in the 16th century and enlarged in the 17th 
 Church of Santa Maria della Pietà (17th century)

Culture
Events in the village include:

 Carnevale Gesualdino (Gesualdo Carnival), a parade of paperboard wagons and masked groups, held in the Carnival period

References

External links 

Official webseite
Gesualdo e Carlo Gesualdo  *A living document in the interior Campania, Italy: the Castle of Gesualdo

Hilltowns in Campania